Pyramid Lake is a kidney-shaped lake in Jasper National Park, Alberta, Canada. It lies at the foot of Pyramid Mountain, a natural landmark that overlooks the town of Jasper.

Several picnic sites are established on the shores of the lake, as well as boat ramps. Pyramid Lake Resort is located on the southeast point of the lake. Pyramid Island is a short distance from the resort, there is a small parking area which can be accessed by a road or hiking trails, then you cross a small wood foot bridge to the island itself, which has benches, picnic tables and a small open wooden shelter. Pyramid Lake is connected to the town of Jasper by Pyramid Lake Road and hiking trails, as well as hiking trails to other tourist sites such as Pyramid Mountain, Patricia Lake and Cabin Lake.

References

External links
 Pyramid Lake at Parks Canada website
 Walking paths near Pyramid Lake
 Pyramid Lake Alberta fishing guide
 Weather forecast for Pyramid Lake

Jasper National Park
Lakes of Alberta